October is the tenth month of the year in the Julian and Gregorian calendars and the sixth of seven months to have a length of 31 days. The eighth month in the old calendar of Romulus , October retained its name (from Latin and Greek ôctō meaning "eight") after January and February were inserted into the calendar that had originally been created by the Romans. In Ancient Rome, one of three Mundus patet would take place on October 5, Meditrinalia October 11, Augustalia on October 12, October Horse on October 15, and Armilustrium on October 19. These dates do not correspond to the modern Gregorian calendar. Among the Anglo-Saxons, it was known as Winterfylleth (Ƿinterfylleþ), because at this full moon, winter was supposed to begin.

October is commonly associated with the season of spring in parts of the Southern Hemisphere, and autumn in parts of the Northern Hemisphere, where it is the seasonal equivalent to April in the Southern Hemisphere and vice versa.

October symbols 

October's birthstones are the tourmaline and opal.
Its birth flower is the calendula.
The zodiac signs for this month are Libra (until October 22) and Scorpio (from October 23 onwards).
The French word octobre is shortened to 8bre.

October observances 
This list does not necessarily imply either official status or general observance.

Non-Gregorian observances:  dates 
(All Baha'i, Islamic, and Jewish observances begin at the sundown prior to the date listed, and end at sundown of the date in question unless otherwise noted.)
List of observances set by the Bahá'í calendar
List of observances set by the Chinese calendar
List of observances set by the Hebrew calendar
List of observances set by the Islamic calendar
List of observances set by the Solar Hijri calendar

Month-long observances 
Black History Month in the United Kingdom
In Catholic Church tradition, October is the Month of the Holy Rosary.
Breast Cancer Awareness Month
 Health Literacy Month 
International Walk to School Month 
 Medical Ultrasound Awareness Month 
 Rett Syndrome Awareness Month
 World Blindness Awareness Month
World Menopause Month
 Vegetarian Awareness Month

United States 
The last two to three weeks in October (and, occasionally, the first week of November) are normally the only time of the year during which all of the "Big Four" major professional sports leagues in the U.S. and Canada schedule games; the National Basketball Association begins its preseason and about two weeks later starts the regular season, the National Hockey League is about one month into its regular season, the National Football League is about halfway through its regular season, and Major League Baseball is in its postseason with the League Championship Series and World Series. Prior to the COVID-19 pandemic in 2020, which necessitated changes to the sporting calendar and led to the four leagues' schedules coinciding earlier and more frequently than normal, there were 19 occasions in which all four leagues played games on the same day (an occurrence popularly termed a sports equinox), with the most recent of these taking place on October 27, 2019. Additionally, the Canadian Football League is typically nearing the end of its regular season during this period, while Major League Soccer is beginning the MLS Cup Playoffs.

American Archives Month
National Adopt a Shelter Dog Month 
National Arts & Humanities Month 
National Bullying Prevention Month
National Cyber Security Awareness Month
National Domestic Violence Awareness Month 
Filipino American History Month 
Italian-American Heritage and Culture Month 
Polish American Heritage Month
National Work and Family Month

United States, Health-related 
 American Pharmacist Month
Celebrating All of October Dwarfism/Little People/Short Stature/Skeletal Dysplasia Awareness
Dwarfism/Little People Awareness Month 
Eczema Awareness Month  
 National Dental Hygiene Month
 National Healthy Lung Month
 National Infertility Awareness Month
 Liver Awareness Month 
 National Lupus Erythematosus Awareness Month
 National Physical Therapy Month
 National Spina Bifida Awareness Month
 Sudden Infant Death Syndrome Awareness Month  (United States)

United States, Culinary 
 National Pizza Month
 National Popcorn Poppin’ Month
 National Pork Month
 National Seafood Month

Movable observances, 2022 dates 
Oktoberfest celebrations (varies globally based on area)
Astronomy Day: October 1 
World Cerebral Palsy Day: October 6
World College Radio Day: October 7
Earth Science Week: October 9–15
See also Movable Western Christian observances
See also Movable Eastern Christian observances

October 2 
Excessivism (United States)

First Sunday: October 2 
Daylight saving time begins (Australia)
Father's Day (Luxembourg)
Grandparents Day (Queensland, Australia, United Kingdom) 
Teachers' Day (Belarus, Latvia, Ukraine)

First Full Week: October 2–8 
Albuquerque International Balloon Fiesta (United States)
Mental Illness Awareness Week (United States)

First Monday: October 3 
 Child Health Day (United States) 
 Children's Day (Chile, Singapore)
 Labour Day (Australian Capital Territory, New South Wales, South Australia, Queensland, Australia)
 Peat Cutting Monday (Falkland Islands)
 Thanksgiving (Saint Lucia)
 World Architecture Day 
 World Habitat Day

First Tuesday: October 4 
National Night Out (Florida and Texas, United States)

First Wednesday: October 5 
Children's Day (Chile)

First Thursday: October 6 
National Poetry Day (UK, Ireland)

First Friday: October 7 
Children's Day (Singapore)
Lee National Denim Day (United States)
World Smile Day

Second Saturday: October 8 
International Migratory Bird Day (Mexico, Central and South America, and the Caribbean)
Home Movie Day (International observance)
National Tree Planting Day (Mongolia)

Second Sunday: October 9 
National Grandparents Day (Germany, Hong Kong)

Week of October 9: October 9–15 
Fire Prevention Week (Canada, United States)
Fire Service Recognition Day (Canada), last day of Fire Prevention Week: October 10

Week of October 10: October 9–15 
Fiji Week (Fiji)

Second Monday: October 10 
Columbus Day (United States)
Indigenous Peoples' Day (Parts of the United States)
Native American Day (South Dakota, United States)
Fraternal Day (Alabama, United States)
Health and Sports Day (Japan)
Mother's Day (Malawi)
Norfolk Island Agricultural Show Day (Norfolk Island)
Thanksgiving (Canada)
National Day (Republic of China)

Second Tuesday: October 11 
Ada Lovelace Day

Second Wednesday: October 12 
Policy Statement of Belgian Parliament (Belgium)

Wednesday of second full week in October: October 12 
National Fossil Day (United States)

Second Thursday: October 13 
World Sight Day

Second Friday: October 14 
Arbor Day (Namibia) 
World Egg Day

Third Saturday: October 15 
Sweetest Day (United States)

Third Sunday: October 16 
Teacher's Day (Brazil)
Mother's Day (Argentina)

Third Monday: October 17 
Heroes' Day (Jamaica) 
Mother's Day (Argentina)
Nanomonestotse (Native American communities)
Boss's Day (United States, Canada, Lithuania and Romania)

Third Thursday: October 20 
International Credit Union Day

Fourth Saturday: October 22 
Children's Day (Malaysia)
Make a Difference Day (United States)

Week of Fourth Wednesday: October 23–29 
Children's Week (Australia)

Fourth Monday: October 24 
Labour Day (New Zealand)

Fourth Wednesday: October 26 
Children's Day (Australia)

Last Friday: October 28 
National Bandanna Day (Australia)
Nevada Day (Nevada, United States) (though the state was actually admitted on October 31, 1864)
Teacher's Day (Australia) (If the last Friday is on October 31, this holiday is moved to November 7)

Last Sunday: October 30 
European Summer Time ends
Grandparents Day (New South Wales, Australia)
Székely Autonomy Day (Romania)

Last Monday: October 31 
October Holiday (Ireland)

Fixed observances 

October 1
Armed Forces Day (South Korea)
Children's Day (El Salvador, Guatemala, Sri Lanka)
Day of Prosecutors (Azerbaijan)
Continuance of German-American Heritage Months, which runs from September 15 – October 15   (United States)
Continuance of National Hispanic Heritage Month which runs from September 15 – October 15 (United States),
Ground Forces Day (Russia) 
Independence Day (Cyprus)
Independence Day (Nigeria)
Independence Day (Palau)
Independence Day (Tuvalu)
International Coffee Day
International Day of Older Persons
International Music Day 
Lincolnshire Day (United Kingdom)
National Day of the People's Republic of China (People's Republic of China)
Pancasila Sanctity Day (Indonesia)
Teacher's Day (Uzbekistan)
Unification Day (Cameroon)
World Vegetarian Day
October 2
Batik Day (Indonesia)
Feast of the Guardian Angels 
National Grandparents Day (Italy)
Gandhi's birthday-related observances:
Gandhi Jayanti (India)
International Day of Non-Violence 
World Day for Farmed Animals
Independence Day (Guinea)
October 3
Gaecheonjeol (South Korea)
German Unity Day (Germany)
National Day (Iraq)
Morazán Day (Honduras)
October 4
 Feast of Saint Francis of Assisi
Cinnamon Roll Day (Sweden)
Day of Peace and Reconciliation (Mozambique)
Independence Day (Lesotho)
World Animal Day 
The beginning of World Space Week (October 4–10)
October 5
Armed Forces Day (Indonesia)
Constitution Day (Vanuatu)
Engineer's Day (Bolivia)
International Day of No Prostitution 
Republic Day (Portugal)
Teachers' Day (Pakistan)
Teachers' Day (Russia)
World Teachers' Day 
October 6
Day of Commemoration and National Mourning (Turkmenistan)
Dukla Pass Victims Day (Slovakia)
German-American Day (United States)
Memorial Day for the Martyrs of Arad (Hungary)
National Noodle Day (United States)
Teachers' Day (Sri Lanka)
Yom Kippur War commemorations:
Armed Forces Day (Egypt)
Tishreen Liberation Day (Syria)
October 7
Our Lady of the Rosary
International Trigeminal Neuralgia Awareness Day
Teachers' Day (Laos)
October 8
Air Force Day (India)
Arbor Day (Namibia)
National Independence Day (Croatia)
Navy Day (Peru)
October 9
Hangul Day (South Korea)
Independence Day (Uganda)
Independence of Guayaquil (Ecuador)
Leif Erikson Day (United States, Iceland and Norway)
National Day of Commemorating the Holocaust (Romania)
Takayama Autumn Festival (Takayama, Japan)
World Post Day 
Valencian Community Day (Spain)
October 10
Arbor Day (Poland)
Capital Liberation Day (Vietnam)
Double Ten Day (Taiwan)
Fiji Day (Fiji)
Finnish Literature Day (Finland)
Independence Day (Cuba)
Party Foundation Day (North Korea)
World Mental Health Day 
October 11
General Pulaski Memorial Day (United States)
International Day of the Girl Child 
International Newspaper Carrier Day
National Coming Out Day (multinational, including United States, United Kingdom and Switzerland among others)
Old Michaelmas Day (Celtic)
Revolution Day (Republic of Macedonia)
October 12
Children's Day (Brazil)
Discovery of America by Columbus-related observances (see also October 8):
Columbus Day (Honduras)
Día de la Hispanidad or Fiesta Nacional de España, also Armed Forces Day (Spain)
Día de la Raza (El Salvador, Uruguay)
Día de la Resistencia Indígena, "Day of Indigenous Resistance" (Venezuela)
Día de las Américas (Belize)
Día de las Culturas, "Day of the Cultures" (Costa Rica)
Día del Respeto a la Diversidad Cultural, "Day of respect for cultural diversity" (Argentina)
Discovery Day (The Bahamas, Colombia)
Feast for Life of Aleister Crowley, celebrated as "Crowleymas" (Thelema)
Fiesta Nacional de España (Spain)
Freethought Day
Independence Day (Equatorial Guinea), celebrates the independence of Equatorial Guinea from Spain in 1968.
UN Spanish Language Day (United Nations)
October 13
Azerbaijani Railway Day (Azerbaijan)
Doi taikomatsuri October 13–15 (Shikokuchūō, Ehime, Japan)
International Day for Natural Disaster Reduction 
National Police Day (Thailand)
Paramedics' Day (Poland)
Rwagasore Day (Burundi)
October 14
World Standards Day
October 15
Breast Health Day (Europe)
Evacuation Day  (Tunisia)
Global Handwashing Day 
King Father's Commemoration Day (Cambodia)
National Latino AIDS Awareness Day (United States)
Pregnancy and Infant Loss Remembrance Day (United States and Canada)
Spirit Day (International observance)
Teachers' Day (Brazil)
White Cane Safety Day (United States)
October 16
World Food Day
Pope John Paul II Day (Poland)
World Anaesthesia Day
October 17
Dessalines Day (Haiti)
International Day for the Eradication of Poverty 
Loyalty Day (Argentina)
October 18
Alaska Day (Alaska, United States)
Independence Day (Azerbaijan)
Necktie Day (Croatia)
Persons Day (Canada)
World Menopause Day
October 19
 Constitution Day (Niue)
 Mother Teresa Day (Albania)
 World Toilet Day
October 20
Arbor Day (Czech Republic) 
Heroes' Day (Kenya) 
Revolution Day (Guatemala)
Vietnamese Women's Day (Vietnam)
World Osteoporosis Day 
World Statistics Day
October 21
Apple Day (United Kingdom)
Armed Forces Day (Honduras)
Egyptian Naval Day (Egypt)
Indian Police Commemoration Day (India)
International Day of the Nacho 
National Nurses' Day (Thailand)
Ndadaye Day (Burundi)
Overseas Chinese Day (Taiwan)
Trafalgar Day (the British Empire in the 19th and early 20th century)
October 22
Fechner Day (International observance) 
International Caps Lock Day 
International Stuttering Awareness Day 
Jidai Matsuri (Kyoto, Japan)
National Santri Day (Indonesia)
Wombat Day (Australia)
October 23
Aviator's Day (Brazil) 
Chulalongkorn Day (Thailand)
Day of the Macedonian Revolutionary Struggle (Republic of Macedonia)
Liberation Day (Libya) 
Mole Day (International observance)
National Day (Hungary)
Paris Peace Agreement Day (Cambodia)
October 24
Azad Kashmir Day (Pakistan) 
Day of Special Forces of the Armed Forces (Russia)
Food Day (United States)
Independence Day (Zambia)
Suez Day (Egypt)
United Nations Day (International observance)
World Development Information Day 
World Polio Day 
October 25
Armed Forces Day (Romania)
Constitution Day (Lithuania)
Customs Officer's Day (Russia) 
Day of the Basque Country (Basque Country)
Retrocession Day (Taiwan)
Sovereignty Day (Slovenia)
Thanksgiving Day (Grenada)
The Hallowing of Nestorius (Nestorian Christianity) 
October 26
Accession Day (Jammu and Kashmir) 
Angam Day (Nauru)
Armed Forces Day (Benin)
Intersex Awareness Day (International observance)
National Day (Austria)
October 27
Black Cat Appreciation Day (United Kingdom) 
Černová Tragedy Day (Slovakia)
Flag Day (Greece)
Independence Day (Saint Vincent and the Grenadines)
Navy Day (United States) (unofficial, official date is October 13) 
World Day for Audiovisual Heritage
October 28
Day of the Establishment of an Independent Czecho-Slovak State (Czech Republic and Slovakia)
International Animation Day 
Ohi Day (Greece, Cyprus)
Prefectural Earthquake Disaster Prevention Day (Gifu Prefecture, Japan)
Youth Pledge Day (Indonesia)
October 29
Coronation Day (Cambodia)
Cyrus the Great Day (Iran)
National Cat Day (United States) 
Republic Day (Turkey) 
World Stroke Day
October 30
Anniversary of the Declaration of the Slovak Nation (Slovakia)
Day of Remembrance of the Victims of Political Repressions (former Soviet republics, except Ukraine)
Indonesian Banknote Day (Indonesia)
International Orthopaedic Nurses Day
Mischief Night (United States and Canada)
Beggars Night (certain regions of the United States) 
Devil's Night (Michigan, United States)
Thevar Jayanthi (Thevar community, India)
October 31
Start of Allhallowtide October 31 – November 6
The first day of the Day of the Dead, celebrated until November 2 (Mexico)
Día de la Canción Criolla (Peru)
Eve of Winter, the eve of the first day of winter in the Northern hemisphere:
Allantide (Cornwall, United Kingdom)
Halloween (English-speaking countries, also in other locations)
Hop-tu-Naa (Isle of Man, United Kingdom)
Samhain in the Northern Hemisphere, Beltane in the Southern Hemisphere; begins on sunset of October 31 (Gaels, Welsh people and Neopagan Wheel of the Year)
Girl Scouts Founders Day (United States)
King Father's Birthday (Cambodia)
National Unity Day (India)
Reformation Day (Slovenia, parts of Germany, Chile, El Salvador, Dominican Republic, Evangelical Churches and Lutheran Churches)
Saci day (Brazil)
World Savings Day
Statehood Day Nevada, United States

Miscellaneous 
Eric Whitacre composed a piece based on this month, titled October.
Neil Gaiman wrote a story personifying the month, titled "October in the Chair", for his 2006 collection Fragile Things.
Ray Bradbury published a collection of short stories titled The October Country in 1955.
 The song October doth before us go celebrates the progression of spring (from the perspective of the Southern Hemisphere).

External links 

 
10